Krzysztof Etmanowicz (3 March 1959 – 19 December 2012) was a Polish football manager.

References

1959 births
2012 deaths
Polish football managers
Legia Warsaw managers
Znicz Pruszków managers
Polish footballers
Sportspeople from Warsaw
Polonia Warsaw players
Olimpia Poznań players
FK Teplice players
Association footballers not categorized by position